The Old Charleston Jail is a site of historical and architectural significance in Charleston, South Carolina. Operational between 1802 and 1939, it held many notable figures, among them Denmark Vesey, Union officers during the Civil War, high-seas pirates, and Lavinia Fisher. While it has become a popular tourist destination in recent years, it remains one of the most notable historic sites in Charleston that has not been the target of a comprehensive preservation and/or renovation effort. It is also commonly referred to as the Old City Jail by the people of Charleston, South Carolina.

History
The Old Charleston Jail was originally located on a four-acre parcel set aside for public use in 1680, at the time of Charleston's earliest settlement. Operating as the Charleston County Jail from 1802 until 1939, it housed Charleston's most infamous criminals, and Federal prisoners of war during the Civil War. When the Jail was constructed in 1802 it consisted of four stories, topped with a two-story octagonal tower. Charleston architects Barbot & Seyle were responsible for 1855 alterations to the building, including a rear octagonal wing, expansions to the main building and the Romanesque Revival details. This octagonal wing replaced a fireproof wing with individual cells, designed by Robert Mills in 1822, five years earlier than his notable Fireproof Building. The 1886 earthquake badly damaged the tower and top story of the main building, and these were subsequently removed.

The Old Jail housed a great variety of inmates. John and Lavinia Fisher, and other members of their gang, convicted of highway robbery in the Charleston Neck region were imprisoned here in 1819 to 1820. Some of the last 19th-century high-seas pirates were jailed here in 1822 while they awaited hanging. The Jail was active after the discovery of Denmark Vesey's planned slave revolt. Although the main trials were held elsewhere, four white men convicted of supporting the 1822 plot were imprisoned here. Tradition holds that Vesey spent his last days in the tower before being hanged, although no extant document indicates this.  William Moultrie, General during the American Revolution and later Governor of South Carolina, allegedly spent a short time in debtor's prison at the Jail.

During the Civil War, Confederate and Federal prisoners of war were incarcerated here.  Most notably were numerous African American soldiers from the 54th Massachusetts Regiment captured after their assault on Fort Wagner in July 1863.

It is one of more than 1400 historically significant buildings within the Charleston Old and Historic District. In 1965, the city zoning board approved its use as a museum and gift store.

Notable Inmates

 Civil War prisoners of war
Denmark Vesey, accused of planning a slave revolt, executed in 1822.
 High-seas pirates
Jacque Alexander Tardy held from 1825-27 for attempt to steal a pilot boat, also responsible for innocent John Gibson being tried and hanged for his 1817 piracy.
Lavinia Fisher and her husband John Fisher, publicly executed after being accused of highway robbery.  Both held claim to their innocence.

Modern History

Decommission and American College of the Building Arts 
After its decommissioning in 1939, the Old Charleston Jail, along with the Robert Mills-designed Mariners Hospital and other land, became the property of the Housing Authority of the City of Charleston to allow for the development of the Robert Mills Manor public housing project. The Jail was generally unused during the Housing Authority's 61 years of ownership. It remains the largest unrestored property in the city of Charleston's historic district.

In 2000, the American College of the Building Arts (ACBA) acquired the Old Charleston Jail for use as its campus and headquarters. Inspired by legendary Charleston master artisan, Philip Simmons, the College was established in 1998 to train craftsmen in building preservation, the need for which had become evident in 1989 when Hurricane Hugo swept through Charleston and severely damaged many of the city's historic structures. Upon acquiring the Old Charleston Jail, the ACBA completed an emergency stabilization program to preserve the original Jail facilities, most of which remain intact. The program consisted of multiple interventions of a period of several years, the largest being structural steel towers that were constructed inside the Main Cell Block, the oldest existing portion of the building, and bolted to the surrounding walls to arrest the deterioration of the masonry structure. Today, the Old City Jail is an official "Save America's Treasures" project of the National Trust for Historic Preservation and the White House Millennium Council.

The American College of the Building Arts (ACBA) moved out of the Jail in the summer of 2016 to a new location at 649 Meeting Street.  In December 2016, the Old Charleston Jail was sold to Old City Jail, LLC, a partnership controlled by Mount Pleasant-based real estate company Landmark Enterprises. Landmark is currently planning a major renovation and historic preservation effort for the building and property. The building has several issues that need to be addressed. Over seventy percent of the stucco is damaged and a fair number of the granite windowsills need to be repaired. Additionally, a new staircase and elevator need to be added.

Tours 
Tours of the Old Charleston Jail have been available since 2003, and the Jail has become popular with tourists as well as on television. It has been featured in a variety of television shows including Travel Channel, Food Network, Ghost Hunters, Ghost Adventures, Ghost Brothers, and BuzzFeed Unsolved.

References

External links

Buildings and structures in Charleston, South Carolina